Welsh rock band Stereophonics have released twelve studio albums, one live album, one compilation album, four extended plays (EP), two box sets, forty-seven singles and thirty-nine music videos. In the UK, Stereophonics have been awarded six multi-platinum album certifications, one platinum and six gold; one of their singles has been awarded a multi-platinum certification, three platinum, one gold and nine silver. They have sold over 9,000,000 albums in the UK,  5,400,000 singles and 100,000 video albums, making them one of the most successful Welsh rock acts. With albums charting across the globe they have sold over 10 million copies worldwide. The band released their first studio album, Word Gets Around in 1997 which reached number six in the UK Albums Chart. With the release of "The Bartender and the Thief" and its album Performance and Cocktails (1999), the band achieved mainstream success within the UK. The album was certified 6× platinum and is one of the band's best-selling albums.

In 2001 the group released their best-selling album Just Enough Education to Perform (2001) which was certified 6× platinum in the UK, having sold over 1,800,000 copies, and 2× platinum in Europe. It contains one of the band's signature songs "Have a Nice Day" which charted at number five in the UK. In 2003 the band released "Maybe Tomorrow", the second single from You Gotta Go There to Come Back (2003). It became one of Stereophonics' best charting singles in the UK, peaking at number three. "Dakota" was released in 2005 and brought Stereophonics their only UK number one single; its parent album Language. Sex. Violence. Other? (2005) became the band's fourth consecutive number-one album that same year. The single would also lend its name to their first live album a year later, Live from Dakota (2006). Pull the Pin (2007) also topped the UK charts to give them their fifth consecutive number one album, despite receiving mixed to negative reviews.

A greatest hits compilation was issued in late 2008, which was certified 5× platinum in the UK with over 1,500,000 copies sold. Keep Calm and Carry On (2009) was released one year later which became a commercial disappointment. After the Keep Calm and Carry On Tour concluded in 2010 the band took a break from releasing an album every two years, this resulted in their next studio album to be released in 2013. Graffiti on the Train (2013) brought back critical favor but failed to repeat the commercial success of their first few albums. It was also the first of two volumes, the second of which, Keep the Village Alive (2015), brought Stereophonics their first number-one album in eight years and their sixth overall.

Albums

Studio albums

Live albums

Compilation albums

Box sets

Extended plays

Singles

As lead artist

As featured artist

Other charted songs

Video albums

Music videos

As lead artist

References
Notes

Footnotes

Bibliography

 

Stereophonics
Discographies of British artists
Rock music group discographies